is a Japanese tennis player.

She has achieved a career-high ITF juniors ranking of 41 in the world.

Kawaguchi and her partner Adrienn Nagy won the 2019 Australian girls' doubles title, beating Emma Navarro and Chloe Beck in the final.

ITF Circuit finals

Singles: 2 (1 title, 1 runner-up)

Doubles: 2 (1 title, 1 runner-up)

Junior Grand Slam finals

Girls' doubles

References

External links
 
 

2002 births
Living people
People from Nagasaki Prefecture
Sportspeople from Nagasaki Prefecture
Japanese female tennis players
Grand Slam (tennis) champions in girls' doubles
Australian Open (tennis) junior champions
21st-century Japanese women